Harold Jackson is an American journalist who won a  Pulitzer Prize. In 2010, he was editor of the editorial page of The Philadelphia Inquirer. He was formerly an editorial writer at The Baltimore Sun and The Birmingham News (Alabama).

Early life and education
Jackson grew up in Birmingham, Alabama. He obtained his degree in journalism and political science from Baker University in 1975.

Career
Jackson was the coordinator of The Inquirer's daily commentary and Sunday Voices pages. In 2004 he became deputy editor of the editorial page. He also worked at United Press International and the Birmingham Post-Herald.

Awards and honors
With two Birmingham News colleagues, Ron Casey and Joey Kennedy, Jackson won the annual Pulitzer Prize for Editorial Writing in 1991, citing "their editorial campaign analyzing inequities in Alabama's tax system and proposing needed reforms."

References

Living people
African-American journalists
American newspaper editors
Pulitzer Prize for Editorial Writing winners
The Philadelphia Inquirer people
Year of birth missing (living people)
Place of birth missing (living people)
21st-century African-American people